Heterocyclus is a genus of minute freshwater snails with an operculum, aquatic gastropod molluscs or micromolluscs in the family Hydrobiidae.

Species
Species within the genus Heterocyclus include:
Heterocyclus perroquini (Crosse, 1872)
Heterocyclus petiti (Crosse, 1872)

References

 Nomenclator Zoologicus info

Hydrobiidae
Taxonomy articles created by Polbot